The Marine Barracks, Naval Air Station Midway was a United States Marine Corps detachment responsible for security at Naval Air Station Midway following World War II.  The unit was originally formed in March 1941 as the 6th Defense Battalion with the mission of providing air and coastal defense for advanced naval bases. During the war the battalion is most noted for defending Midway Atoll against Japanses air raids during the Battle of Midway.  The 6th Defense Battalion garrisoned Midway for the remainder of the war and was later re-designated as the Marine Barracks, Naval Air Station Midway on 1 February 1946.  Marine Barracks Midway was decommissioned on 31 October 1949

History

World War II

Formation, training and movement to Midway
The 6th Defense Battalion was commissioned on 1 March 1941 in San Diego, California. The battalion's main body departed Hawaii on 7 September, arriving at Midway Atoll on 11 September. The 6th Defense Battalion relieved the 3rd Defense Battalion on Midway and continued defensive preparations.

Early action during the war
On 7 December 1941, upon hearing of the Attack on Pearl Harbor, the 6th Defense Battalion immediately went to general quarters; however, no attacks transpired that day. That evening, two destroyers from the Imperial Japanese Navy, the Sazanami and Ushio began shelling the atoll for 23 minutes.   One 5-inch battery from the 6th Defense Battalion engaged the destroyers during their second run until they departed the area. During this engagement, First Lieutenant George H. Cannon was mortally wounded; however, he refused evacuation while reorganizing his battery's command post.  For his actions he was posthumously awarded the Medal of Honor.  In total, ten marines from the battalion were killed in action and an additional ten more were wounded in action.

The battalion received additional reinforcements at the end of December with the arrival of the seaplane tender  carrying personnel from the 4th Defense Battalion and more importantly, ground based radars for the early detection of incoming Japanese aircraft.

The next attack on Midway occurred on the evening of 25 January 1942, when a Japanese submarine, nicknamed "Oscar" by the defenders of the island, surfaced and began shelling Sand Island.  Batteries from the 6th Defense Battalion engaged; however, these attacks continued off and on for the next few days until the submarine was caught out in the open and strafed by Marine fighter planes from VMF-221.

Battle of Midway

On 2 May 1942, Admiral Chester W. Nimitz spent the entire day at Midway inspecting the island.  He spent a great deal of time with LtCol Shannon and inquired about what his defense battalion required in order to repel an amphibious assault. LtCol Shannon also assured Nimitz that if properly supported he could hold the island.  Upon returning to his headquarters at Pearl Harbor, Admiral Nimitz wrote a joint letter to LtCol Shannon and Commander Cyril T. Simard, Commanding Officer of the Naval Air Station.  He instructed both that they had been spot promoted to Colonel and Captain respectively, their garrison would receive his full support and he also let them know that he had intelligence that Midway was going to be attacked by the Japanese at the end of the month. Shortly thereafter, five additional antiaircraft batteries from the 3d Defense Battalion reinforced the island along with two companies from the Marine Corps' 2nd Raider Battalion.  Battalion strength had swelled to nearly 1700 personnel by early June 1942.
by
At 0555 on the morning of 4 June 1942, 6th Defense Battalion's SCR-270 early warning radar picked up a large force of Japanese aircraft approximately ninety miles out and approaching from 320 degrees.  Thirty-six Japanese bombers eventually made it to Midway in two waves and were engaged by the guns of the reinforced battalion.  Japanese after action reports detail losing three aircraft to antiaircraft fire that morning. The 6th Defense Battalion's battle standard can be seen in the early portions of John Ford's film  The Battle of Midway. The film also depicts members of the battalion engaging Japanese aircraft during the battle.

Post War & Decommissioning
The 6th Defense Battalion remained at Midway for the remainder of World War II.  Unlike all of the other defense battalions which were either decommissioned or had their coastal guns removed and were converted to anti-aircraft battalions, the 6th retained its moniker throughout the war.  On 1 February 1946 the 6th Defense Battalion was re-designated as Marine Barracks, Naval Air Station Midway.  The Marine Barracks was officially decommissioned on 31 October 1949.

Unit awards
A unit citation or commendation is an award bestowed upon an organization for the action cited. Members of the unit who participated in said actions are allowed to wear on their uniforms the awarded unit citation. Marine Barracks, Naval Air Station Midway has been presented with the following awards:

Navy Unit Commendation citation

See also
Marine Defense Battalions
List of United States Marine Corps aviation support units

Citations

References

Bibliography

Web

AAA6
Military units and formations established in 1941
AAA
Military units and formations of the United States Marine Corps in World War II